Parrana San Martino is a village in Tuscany, central Italy, administratively a frazione of the comune of Collesalvetti, province of Livorno. At the time of the 2011 census its population was 217.

The village is about 15 km from Livorno and 8 km from Collesalvetti.

Bibliography 
 

Frazioni of the Province of Livorno